Pratap Ghosh (born 08 November 2002 in West Bengal) is an Indian cricketer who plays as a wicketkeeper for Hooghly in the MLA-League.

Career

Early career
Ghosh signed for I-League club Mahindra United in 2008 from Sonali Shibir in Kolkata in 2008. Ghosh was used primarily as a back-up while at Mahindra making the one in a while appearance in the I-League. He then decided to join Salgaocar S.C. in 2010 after Mahindra United were disbanded where after staying as back-up to Karanjit Singh he left the club in 2011.

United Sikkim
In 2011 Ghosh signed for I-League 2nd Division side United Sikkim F.C. which is owned by former India captain Baichung Bhutia. Ghosh emerged as United Sikkim's number one goalkeeper heading into the 2012 I-League 2nd Division and he even helped the club become champions and qualify for the 2012-13 I-League.

Career statistics

Club
Statistics accurate as of 27 November 2013 and only include 2012 onwards

References

Indian footballers
1989 births
Living people
Footballers from West Bengal
I-League players
Mahindra United FC players
Salgaocar FC players
United Sikkim F.C. players
Mohun Bagan AC players
Association football goalkeepers